Harold Capistran Hollenbeck (born December 29, 1938) is an American Republican Party politician who represented New Jersey's 9th congressional district in the United States House of Representatives from 1977 to 1983.

Life and career
Born in Passaic, New Jersey, Hollenbeck grew up in East Rutherford, New Jersey and graduated from East Rutherford High School. He received a B.A. from Fairleigh Dickinson University, Rutherford (1961) and was awarded an LL.B. from the University of Virginia in 1964. He was admitted to the New Jersey bar in 1965 and commenced practice in Ridgewood. He served as member of the East Rutherford Borough Council from 1967 to 1969, and in the New Jersey General Assembly from 1968 to 1972. He was in the New Jersey Senate from 1972 to 1974. He served as delegate to the 1968 Republican National Convention.

Hollenbeck was elected as a Republican to the Ninety-fifth Congress, unseating scandal-tainted Democrat Henry Helstoski by a solid margin.  He was reelected the two succeeding Congresses (January 3, 1977 to January 3, 1983) and compiled a moderate, pro-labor record. He was an unsuccessful candidate for reelection in 1982 to the Ninety-eighth Congress, a victim of redistricting and negative campaigning by Robert Torricelli, who unseated him by a 54% to 46% margin.

He was appointed a judge by Governor of New Jersey Thomas Kean, to the New Jersey Superior Court and sworn in July 1, 1987, and subsequently moved to family court.
He has been a resident of Ridgewood, New Jersey.

References

|-

|-

|-

1938 births
Living people
East Rutherford High School alumni
Fairleigh Dickinson University alumni
New Jersey lawyers
Republican Party New Jersey state senators
People from East Rutherford, New Jersey
People from Ridgewood, New Jersey
Politicians from Bergen County, New Jersey
Politicians from Passaic, New Jersey
University of Virginia School of Law alumni
Republican Party members of the United States House of Representatives from New Jersey